Dazdak is a village in Lulaman Rural District, in the Central District of Fuman County, Gilan Province, Iran. At the 2006 census, its population was 295, in 73 families.

References 

Populated places in Fuman County